Bad Bergzabern is a municipality in the Südliche Weinstraße district, on the German Wine Route in Rhineland-Palatinate, Germany.

Bad Bergzabern is the seat of the Verbandsgemeinde ("collective municipality") Bad Bergzabern.

Bad Bergzabern has a tradition as a holiday destination and contains various half-timbered houses from the seventeenth and eighteenth centuries. Of particular note from an earlier century is the Gasthaus Zum Engel (1579), which has been described as the most beautiful renaissance building in the entire region.

History
In the sixteenth century local scholars were keen to assert that the town had been founded under the Romans, and sources from this period refer to the medieval Latin name as Tabernae Montanae (trans. "taverns of the mountains"). Although the area was indeed under the control of the Roman empire around the beginning of our era, evidence does not support the notion that Bad Bergzabern had its own origins so far back.

In 1676, during the Franco-Dutch War, the French under Louis XIV infamously laid waste the Palatinate region as part of a scheme to enlarge France. Much of Bad Bergzabern was destroyed in the process. One of the few buildings that did survive the French king's torching of the town was the local duke's administrative office, which later became the Gasthaus zum Engel.

Reconstruction began in the eighteenth century under Gustav, Duke of Zweibrücken. The work involved stone buildings in the newly fashionable baroque style and included a residential Schloss for the duke. The project was directed by the architect Jonas Erikson Sundahl (1678-1762) who shared the duke's own Swedish provenance.

Friedrich Julius Marx, wrote a short history of Bergzabern „Oratio de Tabernis Montanis“ (Zweibrücken 1730).

The overlordship of the dukes of Zweibrücken ended with the French Revolution. On 10 November 1792 the townsfolk applied for incorporation within the new French Republic. A generation later former French frontiers were restored after the fall of Napoleon, however, and under the terms of the Second Peace of Paris (10 November 1815) the whole region came under the control of the Wittelsbach kings of Bavaria.

Population development
1871-1987: Census results:

Sons and daughters of the town 

 Konrad Hubert (1507-1577), theologian and composer
 Tabernaemontanus (actually: Jakob Theodor von Bergzaben; 1522-1590), professor of botany and medicine, honoured as the "father of German botany"
 Johann Wolff (1537-1600), lawyer, diplomat and historian
  (1758-1815), librarian
 Georg Weber (1808-1888), philologist and historian
 Karl Culmann (1821-1881),  civil engineer, structural engineer
 Konrad Knoll (1829-1899), sculptor
 Ludwig Döderlein (1855-1936), zoologist and professor
 Oskar Bolza (1857-1942), mathematician
  (1893-1952), politician (SPD)
 Kurt Beck (born 1949), politician (SPD), 1994-2013 Prime Minister of Rhineland-Palatinate 1994-2013
 Oliver Stang (born 1988), football player

References

External links

Towns in Rhineland-Palatinate
Spa towns in Germany
Palatinate Forest
South Palatinate
Südliche Weinstraße
Palatinate (region)